A. prasina  may refer to:
 Ahaetulla prasina, the Oriental whipsnake, a tree snake species found in South and Southeast Asia
 Anaplectoides prasina, the green arches, a moth species found in the Palearctic realm

Synonyms
 Amydona prasina, a synonym for Trabala vishnou, a moth species found in south-east Asia

See also
 Prasina (disambiguation)